The Return of Rock is the fourth album by Jerry Lee Lewis released on the Smash label in 1965.

Background
This was the first studio album on Smash to feature new material by Lewis, with the pianist having recorded remakes of his Sun hits for Golden Hits of Jerry Lee Lewis the year before. Lewis had not enjoyed much chart success since becoming an industry pariah after the news of his marriage to his 13-year-old cousin Myra came to light in 1958, but he retained a loyal fan base in Europe, which showed great enthusiasm for his wild shows. Lewis had also recorded Live at the Star Club, Hamburg in 1964, an album that many consider one of the wildest performances ever. Lewis had been touring non-stop since the scandal and his ability to play ferocious rock and roll had remained undiminished in the face of dwindling sales. Hoping to recapture his past success, Lewis and producer Shelby Singleton began work on a new rock and roll album.

In the liner notes, Robert Tubert wrote: "Rock is the music which vibrantly records the time in which we live ... and Jerry Lee Lewis is one of its greatest exponents." Rock is "the voice of the young". Jerry Lee Lewis was one of the founders of the new musical idiom in the 1950s. He should be listened to by the 1960s generation because he is "telling it like it is." It was a sales pitch to the new generation by a legendary musician present at the creation of Rock and Roll.

The single released from the album was "Baby, Hold Me Close" backed by "I Believe in You".

Recording
The album featured "Baby, Hold Me Close", a song composed by Jerry Lee Lewis and Bob Tubert. "Baby, Hold Me Close" was the song released as the A side 45 single from the album with "I Believe in You" as the B side. This was the only single from the album. The single reached no. 129 on the Billboard Bubbling Under the Hot 100 Chart. Jerry Lee Lewis performed the song live on the musical variety TV series Shindig! in 1965.

The album includes three Chuck Berry songs, "Maybellene," "Roll Over Beethoven," and "Johnny B. Goode."   Although the two rock and roll icons had been rivals in the past, they did have a mutual respect for one another and Lewis would return again and again to Berry compositions throughout his career. (In the 1987 documentary Hail! Hail! Rock 'n' Roll!, Lewis states, "He's the King of rock and roll. Even my mama said that.")  Lewis also performs  Big Joe Turner's "Flip, Flop and Fly" and the old blues "Corrine, Corrina" in his patented boogie-woogie style. His reading of Hank Ballard's "Sexy Ways" was particularly racy for the time, containing lines like, "Come on darlin', now, I want you to get on your knees one time and shake for Jerry Lee Lewis, honey - yeah!"

Reception

The album was released on June 4, 1965, and cracked the Top 200 but stalled at number 121, lacking the breakout song for a comeback. In 2014 Lewis biographer Rick Bragg observed, "The problem, as always, was material, not technique."  In his 2009 book, Jerry Lee Lewis: Lost and Found, Joe Bonomo, while praising "Baby, Hold Me Close", "Maybellene" and "Sexy Ways", notes that the album came out "as Barbra Streisand, Herman's Hermits, the Supremes, and Herb Alpert and the Tijuana Brass were chumming it up on the Billboard album chart. The bespangled commercial ceiling was dropping fast."  The perception that Lewis was out of step with the times was not helped by the album cover, which Bonomo derides: "The Return of Rock is nearly done in before the needle drops by an atrocious cover: decked out in a mummified paisley tux and frilly shirt, smiling wanly, Jerry Lee looks like Liberace's sickly younger brother, while a few teenagers dance in mild bewilderment as if they'd been teleported from the set of Shindig!" Bonomo, however, characterized the self-penned single from the album "Baby, Hold Me Close" as "a cool studio-concocted groove".

Track listing
Side A
"I Believe in You" (Frank Brunson)
"Maybellene" (Chuck Berry, Alan Freed, Russ Fratto)
"Flip, Flop and Fly" (Chuck Calhoun, Lou Willie Turner)
"Don't Let Go" (Jesse Stone)
"Roll Over Beethoven" (Chuck Berry)
"Herman the Hermit" (Rink Hardin, Marian F. Turner)
Side B
"Baby, Hold Me Close" (Jerry Lee Lewis, Bob Tubert)
"You Went Back on Your Word" (Brook Benton, Bobby Stevenson)
"Corrine, Corrina" (Armenter Chatmon, Mitchell Parish, J. Mayo Williams)
"Sexy Ways" (Hank Ballard)
"Johnny B. Goode" (Chuck Berry)
"Got You on My Mind" (Howard Biggs, Joe Thomas)

Sources
Bonomo, Joe (2010). Jerry Lee Lewis: Lost and Found. New York: Bloomsbury Publishing.
Bragg, Rick. (2014). Jerry Lee Lewis: His Own Story. New York: Harper.
Tosches, Nick (1982). Hellfire. New York: Grove Press.
Gutterman, Jimmy (1991). Rockin' My Life Away: Listening to Jerry Lee Lewis. Nashville: Rutledge Hill Press.
Lewis, Myra; Silver, Murray (1981). Great Balls of Fire: The Uncensored Story of Jerry Lee Lewis. William Morrow/Quill/St. Martin's Press.

References

Jerry Lee Lewis albums
1965 albums
albums produced by Shelby Singleton
Rock-and-roll albums
Smash Records albums